Dundalk entered the 2020 season as the reigning League Champions and League of Ireland Cup holders from 2019. Having qualified for European football for the seventh season in a row, they were entered in the 2020–21 UEFA Champions League. It was manager Vinny Perth's second season as manager until his dismissal following Dundalk's exit from Europe in the first qualifying round of the Champions League. The 2020 season was Dundalk's 12th consecutive season in the top tier of Irish football, their 85th in all, and their 94th in the League of Ireland.

Season summary
After the postponement of the President's Cup due to storm conditions, the scheduled double-double round-robin 36 round League programme commenced on 14 February 2020 and was due to be completed on 23 October 2020. The season was predicted to be a two-horse race between Dundalk and Shamrock Rovers. Both sides won their opening three matches before Rovers won their first encounter, 3–2, in Tallaght Stadium. That game was notable for a goal by Dundalk's Jordan Flores, which was subsequently nominated for the FIFA Puskás Award.

Subsequently, the outbreak of the COVID-19 pandemic saw the cessation of football in line with other European countries ahead of the Round Six match at home to St Patrick's Athletic. The League of Ireland Cup, sponsored by EA Sports, was deferred for the season. The Leinster Senior Cup was abandoned. During the stoppage, assistant manager Ruaidhrí Higgins departed his role for a new role under former Dundalk manager Stephen Kenny with the Republic of Ireland national football team. He was replaced by Alan Reynolds, who had earlier resigned as manager of Waterford.

The league season resumed on 31 July 2020 with a reduced schedule of 18 matches in total. Matches were played behind closed doors for the remainder of the shortened season as part of the Irish government's response to the pandemic. In Europe, Dundalk entered the 2020–21 UEFA Champions League as the seeded team in the first qualifying round. They were drawn away to Celje and defeated 3–0 in the single-leg tie, which was played at Szusza Ferenc Stadion, Budapest (Hungary) because of travel restrictions related to the COVID-19 pandemic between Slovenia and Ireland. In the aftermath of that defeat, manager Vinny Perth was sacked by the club.

On 26 August Filippo Giovagnoli was confirmed as the new manager of Dundalk, with nine league matches remaining. John Gill and Alan Reynolds left the club the following week. After being defeated in the Champions League first qualifying round, they drew Andorran champions Inter Club d'Escaldes in the Europa League second qualifying round, and won 1–0. They were drawn away again in the second round, and defeated Sheriff Tiraspol in Moldova in a penalty shoot-out, following a 1–1 draw. The victory gave Dundalk a chance to reach the group stage for the first time since 2016. In the play-off round, they faced KÍ of Klaksvík in the Faroe Islands at the Aviva Stadium, and won 3–1. Meanwhile, they continued to struggle in the league and eventually finished third, thus qualifying for the new UEFA Europa Conference League.

Dundalk were seeded fourth for the group stage and were drawn in Group B alongside Arsenal, Rapid Wien, and Molde. In the first match at home to Molde, Dundalk took a first half lead through Sean Murray, before going down 2–1. Matchday 2 was the first away match, which was against Arsenal at the Emirates Stadium. It finished 3–0 to the home side. Matchday 3 away to Rapid in Vienna finished 4–3 to the home side after Dundalk had taken the lead. They failed to pick up any points from the second set of matches, and finished bottom of the group on 0 points. They also received a €50,000 fine from Uefa for 'shadow coaching', as interim head coach Filippo Giovagnoli did not hold a Uefa Pro Licence.

In the FAI Cup, which also had a schedule change as a result of the pandemic, they reached the final after wins over Waterford, Cobh Ramblers, Bohemians, and Athlone Town. The 11–0 semi-final victory over Athlone Town saw Dundalk set a new record for the biggest win in the competition's history, and was also a new club record victory. They followed that with a 4–2 extra time victory over the holders, Shamrock Rovers, with David McMillan scoring a hat-trick, to win the Cup for the twelfth time.

First-Team Squad (2020)
Sources:
Note: Substitute appearances in brackets

Out on loan

Competitions

Premier Division

League table

FAI Cup

League Cup
Competition cancelled due to COVID-19 pandemic.

Leinster Senior Cup
Competition abandoned due to COVID-19 pandemic.

Europe

Champions League
First qualifying round

Europa League
Second qualifying round

Third qualifying round

Group stage

The group stage draw was held on 2 October 2020.

Awards

Player of the Month

FIFA Puskás Award (nomination)

Footnotes

References

Dundalk F.C. seasons
Dundalk
Dundalk